Government Senior Secondary School may refer to:

Government Senior Secondary School 31 P.S., Rajasthan, India
Government Senior Secondary School Central Pendam, Sikkim, India
Government Senior Secondary School Dhudi, Punjab, India
Government Senior Secondary School Mamring East Sikkim, Sikkim, India
Government Senior Secondary School Meethari Marwar, Rajasthan, India
Government Senior Secondary School, Nilokheri, Haryana, India

See also
Government Higher Secondary School (disambiguation)
Government Higher Secondary Institute Botingoo, Jammu and Kashmir, India